The 2000–01 FIS Cross-Country World Cup was the 20th official World Cup in cross-country skiing. It started in Beitostølen, Norway on 25 November 2000 and finished in Kuopio, Finland on 25 March 2001. Per Elofsson of Sweden won the overall men's cup, and Yuliya Chepalova of Russia won the women's.

Calendar

Men

Women

Men's team

Women's team

Men's standings

Overall

Sprint

Women's standings

Overall

Sprint

Achievements
Victories in this World Cup (all-time number of victories as of 2000–01 season in parentheses)

Men
 , 6 (7) first places
 , 3 (10) first places
 , 2 (6) first places
 , 2 (5) first places
 , 1 (10) first place
 , 1 (4) first place
 , 1 (2) first place
 , 1 (1) first place
 , 1 (2) first place
 , 1 (2) first place
 , 1 (1) first place

Women
 , 7 (11) first places
 , 6 (21) first places
 , 3 (3) first places
 , 2 (21) first places
 , 1 (2) first place
 , 1 (4) first place

References

External links

FIS Cross-Country World Cup seasons
World Cup 2000-01
World Cup 2000-01